Kesselbach may refer to:

 Kesselbach (Danube), a river of Baden-Württemberg, Germany, tributary of the Danube
 
 Kesselbach (Zwiefalter Aach), a river of Baden-Württemberg, Germany, tributary of the Zwiefalter Aach